The 1971 Georgia Bulldogs football team represented the Georgia Bulldogs of the University of Georgia during the 1971 NCAA University Division football season. This was the first season in which the team gave scholarships to black players; freshmen Richard Appleby, Chuck Kinnebrew, Horace King, Clarence Pope, and Larry West, dubbed "The Five," became the first black players in program history.

Schedule

Source: 1972 Georgia Bulldogs Football Media Guide/Yearbook

Roster

References

Georgia
Georgia Bulldogs football seasons
Gator Bowl champion seasons
Georgia Bulldogs football